Biligiriya Banadalli (Kannada: ಬಿಳಿಗಿರಿಯ ಬನದಲ್ಲಿ) is a 1980 Indian Kannada film, directed by Siddalingaiah and produced by Smt Jayadevi. The film stars Vishnuvardhan, M. P. Shankar, Srinivasa Murthy and T. N. Balakrishna. The film has musical score by Rajan–Nagendra.

Cast

Vishnuvardhan
M. P. Shankar
Srinivasa Murthy
T. N. Balakrishna
C. H. Lokanath
Dinesh
Jai Jagadish
Shakti Prasad
Rajanand
Master S. D. Suresh
Master S. D. Murali
Master Jayasimha
Baby Rajani
Kanchana
Indira
Surekha
Geetha

References

External links
 

1980 films
1980s Kannada-language films
Films scored by Rajan–Nagendra
Films directed by Siddalingaiah